Visitation Park is a neighborhood of St. Louis, Missouri.  The neighborhood is defined by Maple Avenue on the North, Delmar Boulevard on the South, Union Boulevard on the East, and Belt Avenue on the West. Visitation Park is a small neighborhood nestled southeast of the West End neighborhood, just north of DeBaliviere Place.

The Visitation Park neighborhood is named for the Visitation Academy of St. Louis, which was located at the southeast corner of Cabanne Avenue and Belt Avenue from 1892 to 1962. The Visitation Academy was razed in 1962 and the site became Visitation Park. In 1989, the park was renamed to Ivory Perry Park.

Demographics

In 2020 Visitation Park's racial makeup was 77.6% Black, 18.1% White, 0.2% Native American, 1.2% Asian, 2.3% Two or More Races, and 0.7% Some Other Race. 1.5% of the people were of Hispanic or Latino origin.

References

Neighborhoods in St. Louis